Altar is a house music duo of Brazilian producers and DJs Macau and VMC.  Formed in 2000, the duo began receiving recognition in nightclubs in 2003 after the release of their single "Sexercise".  A collaboration with vocalist Jeanie Tracy, "Party People" became their first number-one hit on the U.S. Hot Dance Club Play chart in early 2007.

See also
List of number-one dance hits (United States)
List of artists who reached number one on the US Dance chart

References

External links 
SoundCloud 
Official fanpage

Brazilian dance music groups
Brazilian electronic music groups
Electronic dance music duos
House music duos
Club DJs
DJ duos
Musical groups established in 2001
2001 establishments in Brazil